Anantacāritra (also known as Boundless Practice) is one of the  four great perfected bodhisattvas mentioned in the 15th chapter of the Lotus Sutra. According to the Supplement to the Words and Phrases of the Lotus Sutra (法華文句輔正記), by Tiantai priest Dàoxiān, this bodhisattva is understood as representing eternity.

See also 
 Visistacaritra
 Visuddhacaritra
 Supratisthitacaritra

Notes 

Bodhisattvas
Nichiren Buddhism
Lotus Sutra